William Bateson (8 August 1861 – 8 February 1926) was an English biologist who was the first person to use the term genetics to describe the study of heredity, and the chief populariser of the ideas of Gregor Mendel following their rediscovery in 1900 by Hugo de Vries and Carl Correns. His 1894 book Materials for the Study of Variation was one of the earliest formulations of the new approach to genetics.

Early life and education  

Bateson was born 1861 in Whitby on the Yorkshire coast, the son of William Henry Bateson, Master of St John's College, Cambridge. He was educated at Rugby School and at St John's College, where he graduated BA in 1883 with a first in natural sciences.

Taking up embryology, he went to the United States to investigate the development of Balanoglossus, a worm-like hemichordate which led to his interest in vertebrate origins. In 1883–4 he worked in the laboratory of William Keith Brooks, at the Chesapeake Zoölogical Laboratory in Hampton, Virginia. 
Turning from morphology to study evolution and its methods, he returned to England and became a Fellow of St John's. Studying variation and heredity, he travelled in western Central Asia.

Career
Between 1900 and 1910 Bateson directed a rather informal "school" of genetics at Cambridge. His group consisted mostly of women associated with Newnham College, Cambridge, and included both his wife Beatrice, and her sister Florence Durham. They provided assistance for his research program at a time when Mendelism was not yet recognised as a legitimate field of study. The women, such as Muriel Wheldale (later Onslow), carried out a series of breeding experiments in various plant and animal species between 1902 and 1910. The results both supported and extended Mendel's laws of heredity. Hilda Blanche Killby, who had finished her studies with the Newnham College Mendelians in 1901, aided Bateson in the replication of Mendel's crosses in peas. She conducted independent breeding experiments in rabbits and bantam fowl, as well. 

In 1910 Bateson became director of the John Innes Horticultural Institution  and moved with his family to Merton Park in Surrey. During his time at the John Innes Horticultural Institution he became interested in the chromosome theory of heredity and promoted the study of cytology by the appointment of W. C. F. Newton and in 1923 Cyril Dean Darlington.

In 1919, he founded The Genetics Society, one of the first learned societies dedicated to Genetics.

In his later years he was a friend and confidant of the German Erwin Baur. Their correspondence includes their discussion of eugenics.
He was director of the John Innes Horticultural Institution until his sudden death in February 1926.

Personal life
Bateson was married to Beatrice Durham. He first became engaged to her in 1889, but at the engagement party, was thought to have had too much wine, so his mother in law prevented her daughters' engagement. They finally married 7 years later in June 1896, by which time Arthur Durham had died and his wife had either died (according to Henig) or had somehow been persuaded to drop her opposition to the marriage (according to Cock). Their son was the anthropologist and cyberneticist Gregory Bateson.

Bateson has been described as a "very militant" atheist.

Awards
In June 1894 he was elected a Fellow of the Royal Society and won their Darwin Medal in 1904 and their Royal Medal in 1920. He also delivered their Croonian lecture in 1920. 
He was the president of the British Association in 1913–1914.

Work on biological variation (to 1900) 
Bateson's work published before 1900 systematically studied the structural variation displayed by living organisms and the light this might shed on the mechanism of biological evolution, and was strongly influenced by both Charles Darwin's approach to the collection of comprehensive examples, and Francis Galton's quantitative ("biometric") methods. In his first significant contribution, he shows that some biological characteristics (such as the length of forceps in earwigs) are not distributed continuously, with a normal distribution, but discontinuously (or "dimorphically"). He saw the persistence of two forms in one population as a challenge to the then current conceptions of the mechanism of heredity, and says "The question may be asked, does the dimorphism of which cases have now been given represent the beginning of a division into two species?”

In his 1894 book, Materials for the study of variation, Bateson took this survey of biological variation significantly further. He was concerned to show that biological variation exists both continuously, for some characters, and discontinuously for others, and coined the terms "meristic" and "substantive" for the two types. In common with Darwin, he felt that quantitative characters could not easily be "perfected" by the selective force of evolution, because of the perceived problem of the "swamping effect of intercrossing", but proposed that discontinuously varying characters could. 

In Materials Bateson noted and named homeotic mutations, in which an expected body-part has been replaced by another. The animal mutations he studied included bees with legs instead of antennae; crayfish with extra oviducts; and in humans, polydactyly, extra ribs, and males with extra nipples. These mutations are in the homeobox genes which control the pattern of body formation during early embryonic development of animals. The 1995 Nobel Prize for Physiology or Medicine was awarded for work on these genes. They are thought to be especially important to the basic development of all animals. These genes have a crucial function in many, and perhaps all, animals.

In Materials unaware of Gregor Mendel's results, Bateson wrote concerning the mechanism of biological heredity, "The only way in which we may hope to get at the truth is by the organization of systematic experiments in breeding, a class of research that calls perhaps for more patience and more resources than any other form of biological enquiry. Sooner or later such an investigation will be undertaken and then we shall begin to know." Mendel had cultivated and tested some 28,000 plants, performing exactly the experiment Bateson wanted.

Also in Materials, he stated what has been called Bateson's rule, namely that extra legs are mirror-symmetric with their neighbours, such as when an extra leg appears in an insect's leg socket. It appears to be caused by the leaking of positional signals across the limb-limb interface, so that the extra limb's polarity is reversed.

In 1897 he reported some significant conceptual and methodological advances in his study of variation. "I have argued that variations of a discontinuous nature may play a prepondering part in the constitution of a new species." He attempts to silence his critics (the "biometricians") who misconstrue his definition of discontinuity of variation by clarification of his terms: "a variation is discontinuous if, when all the individuals of a population are breeding freely together, there is not simple regression to one mean form, but a sensible preponderance of the variety over the intermediates… The essential feature of a discontinuous variation is therefore that, be the cause what it may, there is not complete blending between variety and type. The variety persists and is not “swamped by intercrossing”. But critically, he begins to report a series of breeding experiments, conducted by Edith Saunders, using the alpine brassica Biscutella laevigata in the Cambridge botanic gardens. In the wild, hairy and smooth forms of otherwise identical plants are seen together. They intercrossed the forms experimentally, “When therefore the well-grown mongrel plants are examined, they present just the same appearance of discontinuity which the wild plants at the Tosa Falls do. This discontinuity is, therefore, the outward sign of the fact that in heredity the two characters of smoothness and hairiness do not completely blend, and the offspring do not regress to one mean form, but to two distinct forms.”

At about this time, Hugo de Vries and Carl Erich Correns began similar plant-breeding experiments. But, unlike Bateson, they were familiar with the extensive plant breeding experiments of Gregor Mendel in the 1860s, and they did not cite Bateson's work. Critically, Bateson gave a lecture to the Royal Horticultural Society in July 1899, which was attended by Hugo de Vries, in which he described his investigations into discontinuous variation, his experimental crosses, and the significance of such studies for the understanding of heredity. He urged his colleagues to conduct large-scale, well-designed and statistically analysed experiments of the sort that, although he did not know it, Mendel had already conducted, and which would be "rediscovered" by de Vries and Correns just six months later.

Founding the discipline of genetics 

Bateson became famous as the outspoken Mendelian antagonist of Walter Raphael Weldon, his former teacher, and of Karl Pearson who led the biometric school of thinking. The debate centred on saltationism versus gradualism (Darwin had represented gradualism, but Bateson was a saltationist). Later, Ronald Fisher and J.B.S. Haldane showed that discrete mutations were compatible with gradual evolution, helping to bring about the modern evolutionary synthesis.

Bateson first suggested using the word "genetics" (from the Greek gennō, γεννώ; "to give birth") to describe the study of inheritance and the science of variation in a personal letter to Adam Sedgwick (1854–1913, zoologist at Cambridge, not the Adam Sedgwick (1785–1873) who had been Darwin's professor), dated 18 April 1905. Bateson first used the term "genetics" publicly at the Third International Conference on Plant Hybridization in London in 1906. Although this was three years before Wilhelm Johannsen used the word "gene" to describe the units of hereditary information, De Vries had introduced the word "pangene" for the same concept already in 1889, and etymologically the word genetics has parallels with Darwin's concept of pangenesis. Bateson and Edith Saunders also coined the word "allelomorph" ("other form"), which was later shortened to allele.

Bateson co-discovered genetic linkage with Reginald Punnett and Edith Saunders, and he and Punnett founded the Journal of Genetics in 1910. Bateson also coined the term "epistasis" to describe the genetic interaction of two independent loci.

The John Innes Centre holds a Bateson Lecture in his honour at the annual John Innes Symposium.

Publications

Books & Book Contributions

 
 
 
 
 
 
 
 
 
 
 

Journals and other media

See also
Bateson–Dobzhansky–Muller model
Lucien Cuénot

Notes

References

External links 

 
 
 
 William Bateson 1894. Materials for the Study of Variation, treated with special regard to discontinuity in the Origin of Species
 William Bateson 1902. Mendel's Principles of Heredity, a defence
 
 Punnett and Bateson
 Opposition to Bateson  – Documents by, or about, Bateson are on Donald Forsdyke's webpages
 Bateson-Punnett Notebooks digitised in Cambridge Digital Library

1861 births
1926 deaths
People educated at Rugby School
Alumni of St John's College, Cambridge
English geneticists
English atheists
Fullerian Professors of Physiology
Fellows of the Royal Society
Foreign associates of the National Academy of Sciences
Corresponding Members of the Russian Academy of Sciences (1917–1925)
Royal Medal winners
Mutationism
Presidents of the British Science Association
People from Whitby
Bateson family